Vakhtang Gomelauri (born 24 December 1974) is a Georgian politician, who is the Incumbent Minister of Internal Affairs of Georgia and former chief of the State Security Service of Georgia from 25 July 2015 to 9 September 2019.

References 

Living people
1974 births
Politicians from Tbilisi
21st-century politicians from Georgia (country)
Government ministers of Georgia (country)